Psychonoctua albogrisea is a moth in the family Cossidae. It was described by Paul Dognin in 1916. It is found in Guyana.

References

Natural History Museum Lepidoptera generic names catalog

Zeuzerinae
Moths described in 1916